Camp Branch Township is an inactive township in Warren County, in the U.S. state of Missouri.

Camp Branch Township was erected in 1833, taking its name from the creek of the same name within its borders.

References

Townships in Missouri
Townships in Warren County, Missouri